Arhopala theba is a species of butterfly of the family Lycaenidae. It is found in the Philippines on the island of Mindanao.

References

Butterflies described in 1863
Arhopala
Butterflies of Asia
Taxa named by William Chapman Hewitson